Armstrong Cut is one of the largest cuts on the Lackawanna Cut-Off railroad line in northwest New Jersey. Located between approximately mileposts 61.4 and 62.3 in Frelinghuysen Township, the cut was constructed between 1908 and 1911 by contractor Hyde, McFarlan & Burke. The fill was created as a result of the removal of 852,000 cubic yards of fill material from this section of the right-of-way. Armstrong Cut is located on a tangent (straight) section of track, permitting .

Part of the north side of Armstrong Cut collapsed in 1941, completely blocking the Cut-Off, and causing all traffic to be diverted to the Lackawanna Old Road for a month while the embankment was excavated back. Legend has it that the collapse occurred in the middle of the night and that the freight agent at the freight station (the passenger station had closed the previous year) heard the embankment give way and raised the alarm.

Armstrong Cut is named for W.C. Armstrong, who was the principal owner of the land that was acquired for this cut.

References 

Lackawanna Cut-Off